Gaillimh le Gaeilge is a Galway City-based Irish language organisation who work to promote the Irish language in Galway City particularly in the business sector. They were established in 1987. They work with Galway City Council, Galway Chamber and other groups to develop and strengthen Galway City's official status as Ireland's only bilingual city.  Their main schemes include ‘Cairde Ghaillimh le Gaeilge’, ‘Gaeilge sa Ghnó’ business service, ‘Irish on Menus’ and ‘Gradam Sheosaimh Uí Ógartaigh’.

See also
 Official Languages Act 2003
 Gaeltacht 
 Connacht Irish
 Gaeltacht Act 2012
 20-Year Strategy for the Irish Language 2010-2030
 Bailte Seirbhíse Gaeltachta
 Gael-Taca
 Forbairt Feirste 
 List of Irish language media

References

Status of
Culture in Galway (city)
Education in Galway (city)
Celtic language revival